Mikhail Giorgadze (born 14 March 1961) is a Georgian former water polo player who competed in the 1988 Summer Olympics. He was born in Kutaisi.

See also
 Soviet Union men's Olympic water polo team records and statistics
 List of Olympic medalists in water polo (men)
 List of men's Olympic water polo tournament goalkeepers

References

External links
 

1961 births
Living people
Sportspeople from Kutaisi
Male water polo players from Georgia (country)
Water polo goalkeepers
Olympic water polo players of the Soviet Union
Water polo players at the 1988 Summer Olympics
Olympic bronze medalists for the Soviet Union
Olympic medalists in water polo
Medalists at the 1988 Summer Olympics